Big Time is the second studio album by American country music band Little Texas. The band's breakthrough album, it was released in 1993 on Warner Bros. Records, and produced the singles "What Might Have Been", "God Blessed Texas", "My Love", and "Stop on a Dime". Respectively, these peaked at numbers 2, 4, 1, and 14 on the Hot Country Songs charts. "What Might Have Been" was also a crossover hit, reaching 16 on the Hot Adult Contemporary Tracks charts.

The album is also the band's highest certified album, having been certified 2× Platinum by the RIAA.

Track listing

Personnel
As listed in liner notes.

Little Texas
Del Gray – drums
Porter Howell – slide guitar, acoustic guitar, electric guitar, six-string bass guitar, sitar, background vocals
Dwayne O'Brien – acoustic guitar, background vocals
Duane Propes – bass guitar, upright bass, background vocals
Tim Rushlow – lead vocals, background vocals, acoustic guitar
Brady Seals – piano, keyboards, Hammond B-3 organ, lead vocals, background vocals

Additional Musicians
Sam Bacco – percussion
Dennis Burnside – string arrangements, conductor
Carl Gorodetzky – concert master
The Nashville String Machine – strings
Troy Seals – acoustic guitar and rap on "Cutoff Jeans"

Chart performance

References

Little Texas (band) albums
1993 albums
Warner Records albums
Albums produced by James Stroud